Beomeo Station is a station of the Daegu Metro Line 2 in Beomeo-dong, Suseong District, Daegu, South Korea. The Daegu Court and Public Prosecutor's Office are in the vicinity of the station.

Station Facts 
This station is at Beomeo Intersection.  When it first opened, the exits were skewed (four exits at that time) to the west downtown side of Daelgubeol-daero, and so it was inconvenient to transfer from the downtown bus.  In 2006, when the Beomeo-dong Doosan We've the Zenith Apartments were constructed at Beomeo-2-dong, approval for the apartment construction was granted in the process of the transportation impact survey, on the condition that land be donated for an underground walkway and stores that connect Beomeo Station.  As a result, the exists were expanded.  7 exits were newly created in front of Grand Hotel, KTCU, Beomeo-dong Doosan We've the Zenith Apartments, in the vicinity of the Suseonggu- Station and Daegu-Suseong Police Department, and were opened on February 1, 2010.  When the exits were expanded, Beomeo World Plaza, an underground store, was newly constructed, in the same manner as Duryu Station, however, development was slow because no stores were coming in, and instead, Daegu City English Street (E-Street) was made instead on April 24, 2012.  However, the Daegu City English Street was not immune from economic downtown, and there was a risk that it may discontinue operations.  Exit number 7, which was newly constructed in 2010, is near Suseong-gu Office and Suseong Police Department, and it is closer to Suseong-gu Office than Suseong-gu Office Station is.

When major public events are held in the area of Beomeo Intersection, there are times when access to Beomeo Station is blocked.

Once Suseong District Stadium Station opened, the demand was split along the line towards East Daegu, and ridership decreased greatly.  However, since ridership was still higher compared to other stations on Line No. 2, screen doors were installed in 2016 for safety.

The alternative name of this station was Nune Eye Hospital, but this was removed on September 4, 2017.

Ridership Changes 
Ridership greatly increased once the exits were expanded in 2010 however, after 대구 도시철도 3호선 수성구민운동장역 opened, the demand was split towards East Daegu, and ridership greatly decreased.  Presently it has the sixth largest ridership of stations on Line No. 2.

References

External links 
  Cyber station information  from Daegu Metropolitan Transit Corporation

Daegu Metro stations
Suseong District
Railway stations opened in 2005